The Montenegro women's national basketball team is the representative for Montenegro in international women's basketball competitions and it is organized and run by the Basketball Federation of Montenegro.
The Montenegrin women's national team entered international competition in 2008, playing its first official match on August 27, against Republic of Ireland in Bijelo Polje (68-56).
Montenegrin women's team participated on EuroBasket Women three times - 2011, 2013 and 2015, playing two times in quarterfinals.

List of official matches

ECQ - FIBA EuroBasket qualifiers; Div B - FIBA Division B; GSS - Games of the Small States of Europe
As of September 22, 2019.

Montenegro vs. other countries 
Below is the list of performances of Montenegro national basketball team against every single opponent.

Last update: September 22, 2019.

See also
 Montenegro women's national basketball team
 Sport in Montenegro
 Sport in Montenegro
 First А Women's Basketball League of Montenegro
 Montenegro national basketball team

External links
Official website

results
Monte